This is a list of top 100 content platforms services by monthly active users (MAU):

See also 
 List of social platforms with at least 100 million active users

References

Streaming
Internet-related lists